Iotam Bagration was a Georgian royal prince (batonishvili) of the Bagrationi dynasty of House of Mukhrani branch. Iotam was son of Prince Vakhushti of Kartli.

References

18th-century births
Year of birth unknown
Year of death unknown
Georgian princes
House of Mukhrani
18th-century people from Georgia (country)